The Luhansk People's Republic has had a system of vehicle registration plates since May 2016. The plates were recognized as valid in the Russian Federation, alongside the plates of the neighboring Donetsk People's Republic, in February 2017. 

On 21 December 2022 there was a change in terms of license plate issuing. Russian plates were first issued on that day with the Code 181, after The Lugansk People’s Republic became a part of Russia on September 30, 2022 following the unification referendum. The residents with LPR or Ukrainian vehicle registration completed before 14 December 2022 have to re-register by 1 January 2026 with no extra costs. "First LPR residents get Russian driver’s license, vehicle registration plates"

See also
Vehicle registration plates of Russia
Vehicle registration plates of Ukraine
Vehicle registration plates of the DPR

References

External links

Luhansk
Luhansk People's Republic